José Carlos Santana, also known as Santana, is a Brazilian former athlete who specialised in the marathon.

Santana, who was born in São Paulo, was a three-time winner of the Rio de Janeiro Marathon. He claimed a silver medal in the marathon at the 1991 Pan American Games, finishing two seconds behind Alberto Cuba. He had a second-place finish at the 1993 Los Angeles Marathon, which was won by his training partner Joseildo Rocha.

Personal life
Santana is a cousin of marathon runner Marily dos Santos.

References

Year of birth missing (living people)
Living people
Brazilian male marathon runners
Athletes from São Paulo
Pan American Games silver medalists for Brazil
Pan American Games medalists in athletics (track and field)
Medalists at the 1991 Pan American Games
Athletes (track and field) at the 1991 Pan American Games
20th-century Brazilian people
21st-century Brazilian people